Flat Rock Playhouse is a professional, non-profit theatre located in the village of Flat Rock, NC known for quality productions of popular musicals, comedies, and dramas. In 1937, under the direction of Robroy Farquhar, a group of actors organized themselves as the Vagabond Players. Around 1940, the Vagabond players settled in the Blue Ridge region of Western North Carolina. In 1952, the group purchased an 8-acre area of land in the Village of Flat Rock, where the theatre is currently located. In 1961, the theatre was named the State Theatre of North Carolina by the North Carolina General Assembly.

References

External links
 

Theatres in North Carolina
Tourist attractions in Henderson County, North Carolina